The Faculty of Architecture (/Arhitektonski fakultet Univerziteta u Beogradu) is one of the 31 schools of the University of Belgrade. It shares the building with Faculties of Civil Engineering and Electrical Engineering. The Faculty of Architecture is made up of three Departments: Architecture, Urban Planning and Architectural Technologies.

The Faculty of Architecture publishes the triannual Serbian Architectural Journal.

Since the Faculty's foundation in 1948, a total of 8,120 students have completed the five-year program and graduated as Bachelors of Engineering in Architecture. In addition, 362 Masters and 139 Doctoral theses have been defended.

Notable alumni
 Ivan Antić
 Bogdan Bogdanović
 Ana Đurić
 Sanja Ilić
 Branislav Milenkovic
 Ranko Radović
 Zoran Tulum
 Vladimir Veličković

References

External links
 Faculty of Architecture website

Architecture
Belgrade
Architecture
Architecture
Palilula, Belgrade